The Chinese Fountain, also known as the Three Races Fountain is a fountain monument in the Park of the Exhibition of Lima, Peru.

Overview
The work has a marble sculpture at the top, the work of the Italian sculptor Valmore Gemignani, with three characters that represent the fraternity of the human races, the white, the yellow and the black, for which it is also called the Fountain of the Three Races. On the sides are two allegories that represent the Amazon and Yellow rivers, made in bronze by the sculptor Ettore Graziosi. There are also four representations of the Raimondi Stele from the Chavín culture.

History
In 1921, during the government of Augusto B. Leguía, the Centennial of the Independence of Peru was celebrated and many colonies of foreign residents decided to grant gifts in the form of monuments to the Peruvian State. The Chinese colony joined in by creating a promoting committee led by Santiago Escudero Whu and Aurelio Pow San, important merchants and landowners of Chinese origin. The gift chosen was a monumental fountain designed by the architect . The work was executed in Italy, in the workshop of Ettore Genovesi.

The first stone was laid in 1921 in the space previously occupied by the so-called "Kiosko de las Palmeras". The fountain was inaugurated on July 28, 1924.

See also
Chinese Peruvians

Las llamas
La yunta (sculpture)

References

Bibliography

Buildings and structures in Peru
China–Peru relations
1924 in Peru
Buildings and structures completed in 1924